The Dominguez–Escalante National Conservation Area is a  National Conservation Area located in western Colorado southeast of Grand Junction and northwest of Montrose. It is managed by the Bureau of Land Management (BLM), and was created as part of the Omnibus Public Land Management Act of 2009. In 2009  were also designated as the Dominguez Canyon Wilderness.

The Dominguez–Escalante National Conservation Area (NCA) encompasses canyons along the Uncompahgre Plateau along the Gunnison River. The southwest side of the NCA borders Uncompahgre National Forest. There are several trails and campsites in the NCA.

References

External links 
 Dominguez–Escalante National Conservation Area – BLM page
 

National Conservation Areas of the United States
Bureau of Land Management areas in Colorado
Protected areas of Delta County, Colorado
Protected areas of Montrose County, Colorado
Protected areas of Mesa County, Colorado
Protected areas established in 2009
Units of the National Landscape Conservation System
2009 establishments in Colorado